Bran is a commune in Brașov County, Transylvania, Romania.

The medieval Bran Castle is a popular tourist destination, partly because it is associated with the home of Dracula in Bram Stoker's novel of the same name; the castle has been listed as one of the Seven Wonders of Romania.

Geography
Bran is located in the southern part of Brașov County, on or near the border with Dâmbovița and Argeș counties, and belongs to the historical sub-region of Țara Bârsei (Burzenland). It lies at the northern end of the Rucăr-Bran Pass; national road  DN73, which runs through the pass, connects Brașov to Pitești,  to the southwest.

History
The Teutonic Order began building a wooden fort called Dietrichstein here early in the 13th century. After the fort's destruction in 1242 by Mongols ("Tatars"), King Sigismund of Hungary ordered a stone castle to be built in 1377, while the settlement of Bran began to develop nearby. Positioned high atop a steep cliff, the castle guarded a strategic trade route between Transylvania and Wallachia. In 1498, Bran came under the jurisdiction of Brașov.

After the Ottoman Empire defeated the Kingdom of Hungary in the 16th century, Bran became part of the Eastern Hungarian Kingdom and  the Principality of Transylvania, which eventually became part of the Habsburg monarchy. In 1804 the commune became part of the Austrian Empire along with the Grand Principality of Transylvania, and in 1867 the Hungarian section of the Austro-Hungarian Empire. It became part of the Kingdom of Romania following World War I.

After Transylvania became part of Romania, Bran Castle (that was owned by the city of Brașov) was gifted to Queen Marie by the Brașov magistrate. The queen transformed it into a royal residence in the 1920s, and today it is one of Romania's most popular visitor sites. It is open to tourists, who can view the inside alone or as part of a guided tour. Outside the castle is an open-air museum with traditional Romanian farm houses and manufacturing facilities.

Natives
 Marian Blaj (born 1978), biathlete
 Ioan Pușcariu (1824–1911), historian and genealogist, member of the Romanian Academy
 Livia Reit (born 1978), cross-country skier
 Alexandra Stoian (born 1983), biathlete

References

Communes in Brașov County
Localities in Transylvania
Burzenland